Reza Hormes-Ravenstijn, (born 6 February 1967 in Beek (Ubbergen)) is a Dutch cyclo-cross racer. She has won seven races during her career, one of those being the Dutch National Cyclo-cross Championship in 1995. During other Dutch Nationals she won two silver and two bronze medals in addition.

Achievements
 1st in Dutch National Championship Cycle-cross (1995)
 2nd in Dutch National Championship Cycle-cross (1997, 1998)
 3rd in Dutch National Championship Cycle-cross (1996, 2006)
 1st in Cyclo-cross race in Gieten (1996, 2002, 2003)
 1st in Cyclo-cross race in Hoogerheide (2004)
 1st in Cyclo-cross race in Huijbergen (2004)
 1st in Cyclo-cross race in Lille (2006)
 1st in Cyclo-cross race in Cyclo-cross Gazet van Antwerpen (Oudenaarde)
 1st in Cyclo-cross race in Cyclo-cross Gazet van Antwerpen (Lille)
 1st in Cyclo-cross race in Cyclo-cross Gazet van Antwerpen (Oostmalle)

External links
Official website

1967 births
Living people
Dutch female cyclists
Cyclo-cross cyclists
People from Ubbergen
Cyclists from Gelderland